The Boyne River is a river located in the Wide Bay–Burnett region of Queensland, Australia.

Course and features
The Boyne River rises in the Stuart Range, part of the Great Dividing Range, south of Boyneside near Haly Mountain which is at the northwest extent of the Bunya Mountains and within the Bunya Mountains National Park. The river flows generally north joined by twenty tributaries, crossed by the Bunya Highway, and impounded  near the town of Proston to form Lake Boondooma where the Boyne is joined by the Stuart River before reaching its confluence with the Burnett River upstream from Mundubbera at Boynewood. The river descends  over its  course.

The river was named in 1843 by Henry Stuart Russell under the mistaken impression the river was the same watercourse as the Boyne River located in Central Queensland.

See also

References

External links

Rivers of Queensland
Wide Bay–Burnett